Goodnight Cleveland is a documentary film directed by Jim Heneghan for 8th Grade Films chronicling The Hellacopters' North American tour in 2002 in support of their album High Visibility.

Background

The film was shot with one camera and a sound person using the techniques of Direct Cinema and Cinéma vérité. Goodnight Cleveland is noted for its lack of dramatic arc which captures the boredom and tedium of touring life in a very realistic way.

The title Goodnight Cleveland is heard in the film when Hellacopters lead singer Nicke Andersson yells "goodnight Cleveland" to the audience at the end of the Agora Ballroom show, an inverted reference to the mockumentary film This Is Spınal Tap, in which bass player Derek Smalls yells, "Hello Cleveland" to an unseen audience as the band attempts to find their way to the stage, while lost in the boiler room of the theater before a concert.

DVD release

The DVD was only released as DVD region 1 and the main feature runs 48 minutes and comes with four audio tracks (vintage mono mix, band commentary, stereo and Alternative Spaghetti Western Soundtrack). The DVD also includes "over an hour of never-before-seen outtakes". The DVD was sourced from an analog transfer.

References

External links
 
 
 Official website at 8th Grade Films

2002 television films
2002 films
Documentary films about rock music and musicians
American documentary films
Swedish documentary films
The Hellacopters albums
2002 documentary films
2000s American films
2000s Swedish films